The 1964 NCAA College Division football rankings are from the United Press International poll of College Division head coaches and from the Associated Press.  The 1964 NCAA College Division football season was the seventh year UPI published a Coaches Poll in what was termed the "Small College" division. It was the fifth year for the AP version of the poll. 

The UPI poll only included Win/Loss records for the Top 10 in the weekly rankings. In the AP poll, the Win/Loss records were not published except in the Final poll. However, the Win/Loss records are provided in the AP poll section if the UPI also ranked the team.

Legend

The AP poll

The UPI Coaches poll

References

Rankings
NCAA College Division football rankings